The 1975 Baltimore mayoral election saw the reelection of William Donald Schaefer.

Nominations

Democratic primary

Republican primary

General election
The general election was held November 4.

References

Baltimore mayoral
Mayoral elections in Baltimore
Baltimore